Sint Jansbrug (lit. "Bridge of Saint John") is a student fraternity in the city of Delft in the Netherlands, founded in 1947. Both are official monuments.

The fraternity is considered smaller and therefore more accessible than other student fraternities in Delft, while retaining its traditions and mores. It offers cheap student dinners for both members and non-members, as well as coffee and tea in a coffee-bar called Oele which becomes a bar on Friday evenings.

Jaarclubs
Each year's new members of Sint Jansbrug form jaarclubs (year groups), which usually meet weekly. There are men's, women's, and mixed jaarclubs, with approximately 11–15 members each.

Gilden
Sint Jansbrug also has 13 recognised gilden (guilds). Although the name is derived from the historical craft guild, within Sint Jansbrug a gilde consists of members from different years who share similar interests. Membership is by invitation and open only to those in the second year or above. Not every member of Sint Jansbrug is invited to join a gilde, and not everyone invited becomes a member of the gilde.

In books and film
The fraternity's history has been summarized in the 1997 book Broederlijcken Liiefde and the 2007 documentary film Liieve Leden.

References

External links
 Official webpage

Student societies in the Netherlands
Delft University of Technology
Rijksmonuments in Delft